The Mercedes-Benz M18 engine is a naturally-aspirated, 2.9-liter, straight-6, internal combustion piston engine, designed, developed and produced by Mercedes-Benz; between 1933 and 1937.

M18 Engine
Power was delivered to the rear wheels via a four-speed manual transmission with synchromesh on the top two ratios.

Applications
Mercedes-Benz W18

References

Mercedes-Benz engines
Straight-six engines
Engines by model
Gasoline engines by model